Dietrich Kämper (born 1936) is a German musicologist.

Life 
Born in Melle, Niedersachsen, Kämper studied at the University of Cologne and University of Zurich with research stays in Bologna, Florence and Rome. He received his doctorate in 1963 with a dissertation Franz Wüllner – Leben, Wirken und kompositorisches Schaffen at the University of Cologne, where he habilitated in musicology in 1967. Since 1986 he was the holder of the newly established chair for musicology at the Hochschule für Musik und Tanz Köln. In 1995 he was finally appointed to the University of Cologne. His main areas of research were Renaissance music, music of the 20th century and music history of the Rhineland.

Musicological author 
 Franz Wüllner, Arno-Volk-Verlag, Cologne 1963
 Studien zur instrumentalen Ensemblemusik des 16. Jahrhunderts in Italien, Böhlau Verlag, Vienna / Cologne 1970
 Gefangenschaft und Freiheit – Leben und Werk des Komponisten Luigi Dallapiccola, Gitarre-und-Laute-Verlagsgesellschaft, Cologne 1984
 Die Klaviersonate nach Beethoven, Wissenschaftliche Buchgesellschaft, Darmstadt 1987

Musicological editor 
 Richard Strauss und Franz Wüllner im Briefwechsel, Arno-Volk-Verlag, Köln 1963
 Max-Bruch-Studien – Zum 50. Todestag des Komponisten, Arno-Volk-Verlag, Cologne 1970
 Rheinische Musiker – Folge 7, Kassel 1972
 Rheinische Musiker – Folge 8, Merseburger Verlag, Kassel 1974
 Rheinische Musiker – Folge 9, Merseburger Verlag, Kassel 1981
 Frank Martin, das kompositorische Werk – 13 Studien, Bericht über das Internationale Frank-Martin-Symposium, 18 until 20 Oktober 1990 in Köln-Brauweiler, Schott Music, Mainz 1993
 Der musikalische Futurismus, Laaber 1999
 Alte Musik und Aufführungspraxis – Festschrift for Dieter Gutknecht zum 65. Geburtstag, Lit Verlag, Münster / Berlin / Vienna / Zürich 2007
 Max Bruch und Philipp Spitta im Briefwechsel, Merseburger Verlag, Kassel 2013

Festschriften for his birthday 
 Musik – Kultur – Gesellschaft. Interdisziplinäre Aspekte aus der Musikgeschichte des Rheinlandes; Dietrich Kämper zum 60. Geburtstag, edited by the Arbeitsgemeinschaft für rheinische Musikgeschichte, Norbert Jers, Merseburger-Verlag, Kassel 1996
 Aspetti musicali – musikhistorische Dimensionen Italiens 1600 bis 2000; Festschrift für Dietrich Kämper zum 65. Geburtstag, edited by Norbert Bolin, Verlag Dohr, Cologne 2001

References

External links 
 

20th-century German musicologists
Academic staff of the University of Cologne
1936 births
Living people
People from Melle, Germany